Payerne railway station is a railway station in the municipality of Payerne, in the Swiss canton of Vaud. It is located at the junction of the standard gauge Fribourg–Yverdon and Palézieux–Lyss lines of Swiss Federal Railways.

Services 
 the following services stop at Payerne:

 RER Vaud:

References

External links 
 
 

Railway stations in the canton of Vaud
Swiss Federal Railways stations